Woodward Academy (also known as Woodward or WA) is an independent, co-educational college-preparatory school for pre-kindergarten to 12th grade on two campuses located in College Park and Johns Creek, Georgia, United States, within the Atlanta metropolitan area.

History

Woodward Academy was founded in 1900 as Georgia Military Academy. Originally an all-male school, in 1964 it became coeducational and was renamed Woodward Academy in 1966. The boarding program was discontinued in 1993. Woodward draws its students from 23 metro Atlanta counties taken to school by MARTA, Woodward buses, parents, or carpool. The school has two campuses – the Main Campus in College Park (preK-12) and Woodward North in Johns Creek (preK-6).

Academics 
Woodward Academy is divided into five schools. Located on the Main Campus in historic College Park are the Upper, Middle, Lower, and Primary schools. The second campus, Woodward North, serves preK through sixth grade. The Primary School has students in preK through 3rd grade, the Lower School has 4th through 6th grade students, the Middle School has 7th and 8th grade students, and the Upper School has students in 9th grade through 12th grade.

Athletics

Woodward Academy's athletics program sponsors 18 varsity sports across fall, winter and spring seasons.  Woodward (formerly Georgia Military Academy) has won 84 State Championships administered by the Georgia High School Association.

State Championships

 Basketball (Boys): 2020
 Basketball (Girls): 1995, 1996, 1999, 2021, 2022
 Football: 1970, 1980
 Golf (Boys): 1970, 1972, 1974, 2013
 Golf (Girls): 2004, 2005, 2006, 2008, 2016, 2018, 2019, 2021
 Riflery: 2002, 2003, 2004
 Soccer (Boys): 1999, 2004, 2005, 2012
 Soccer (Girls): 2006
 Swimming (Boys): 1946, 1947, 1948, 1949, 1950, 1951, 1952, 1953, 1962, 1963, 1964, 1969, 1970, 1971, 1973, 1987 
 Swimming (Girls): 2014 
 Tennis (Boys): 1987, 2006, 2007, 2008, 2009, 2011, 2012, 2021
 Tennis (Girls): 2008, 2010, 2011, 2015
 Track (Girls): 1986, 2014, 2021
 Volleyball (Girls): 1993, 1996, 2001, 2002, 2003, 2004, 2005, 2008, 2009, 2010
 Wrestling: 1969, 1971, 1972, 2013, 2019 (Traditional), 2019 (Dual), 2020 (Traditional), 2020 (Dual)
 Literary: 1964, 1968
 Debate: 2000, 2001, 2002, 2003, 2004

Notable alumni

Government

 Irlo "Bud" Bronson, Jr. – former Florida State Representative, 1983–1993
 Amy Carter (1985) – daughter of former U.S. President Jimmy Carter
 John James Flynt, Jr. – former U.S. Representative, Georgia's 4th Congressional District, 1954–1979
 Spencer Frye (1986) – Georgia State Representative, 2013–present
 Phil Gramm (1961) – former U.S. Senator, Texas, 1985–2002; U.S. Representative, Texas's 6th Congressional District, 1979–1985
 Marty Harbin – Georgia State Senator, 2015–present
 Brian Jack (2006) – White House Political Director, 2018–2021
 Walter E. Johnston, III (1953) – former U.S. Representative, North Carolina's 6th Congressional District, 1981–1983
 Burt Jones (1998) – Georgia State Senator, 2013–present
 David Knight – Georgia State Representative, 2005–present
 Thomas J. Pearsall (1923) – former Speaker of the North Carolina House of Representatives, 1947–1949; author of the Pearsall Plan, a school integration initiative
 Williamson S. Stuckey, Jr. (1952) – former U.S. Representative, Georgia's 8th Congressional District, 1967–1977; Chairman of Stuckey’s Corporation, 1985–2019
 Randolph W. Thrower (1930) – former U.S. Commissioner of Internal Revenue, 1969–1971
 Andy Welch (1990) – Georgia State Representative, 2011–present
Damian Williams (1998)- United States Attorney for the Southern District of New York
 Bruce Williamson (1972) – Georgia State Representative, 2011–present
 Fred Wood – Idaho State Representative, 2006–present

Athletics

 Andrew Adams (2011) – NFL player, 2016–present
 Henry Anderson (2010) – NFL player, 2015–present; 93rd pick of the 2015 NFL Draft
 Kiesha Brown (1996) – former WNBA player, 2002–2010
A. J. Cole III (2014) – NFL player, 2019–present
 Delino DeShields, Jr. (2010) – MLB player, 2015–present; 8th overall pick of the 2010 MLB Draft
 Elijah Holyfield (2016) – NFL player, 2019–present; son of Evander Holyfield
 Julian Jenkins (2002) – former NFL player, 2006; 156th pick of the 2006 NFL Draft
 Dan Lyle (1988) - United States national rugby union team player, 1994–2003
 Tommy Lyons (1966) – former NFL player, 1971–1976; 350th pick of the 1971 NFL Draft
Spider Maxwell (1983), former collegiate gymnast; 1987 Nissen Award Winner
 Erskine Mayer (1907) – former MLB player, 1912–1919
 Tim Simpson (1974) – former PGA Tour golfer, 1977–1998; former PGA Tour Champions golfer, 2006–2011
 Reed Sorenson (2004) – Monster Energy NASCAR Cup Series driver, 2005–present
 Juwan Thompson (2010) – former NFL player, 2014–2016
 Walker Kessler (2020) – NBA player, 2022–present

Military

 Julien J. LeBourgeois – former Vice Admiral, United States Navy; President of the U.S. Naval War College, 1974–1977
 Stephen W. Pless (1957) – former Major, United States Marine Corps; Medal of Honor recipient

Business
 Michael C. Carlos (1944) – former Chairman and CEO of the National Distributing Company; philanthropist
 Edwin W. Pauley (1919) – oil company executive; philanthropist
 Robert W. Woodruff (1908) – former President of The Coca–Cola Company, 1923–1955; philanthropist

Academia
  James D. Bales- bible professor at Harding University
 Phillip Griffiths – mathematician
 James F. Jones, Jr. (1965) – President of the Sweet Briar College, 2014–present; former President of Trinity College, 2004–2014; former President of Kalamazoo College, 1996–2004
 Sheryl McCollum – professor, crime analyst, non–profit founder/director
 William Tate – former Dean of Men at University of Georgia, 1946–1971

Entertainment
 Scott Budnick (1995) – film producer, most notably of The Hangover
 Roshani Chokshi (2009) – author
 Sterling Holloway (1920) – film and voice actor
 Jeffrey Stepakoff (1981) – film and TV writer, most notably of Dawson's Creek; author
 Kris Kross - 90's rap duo
 Alonso Duralde (1984) - film critic (TheWrap) and author

References

External links

 Woodward Academy

Private K-12 schools in Fulton County, Georgia
Educational institutions established in 1900
Preparatory schools in Georgia (U.S. state)
College Park, Georgia
1900 establishments in Georgia (U.S. state)